Blue Soul may refer to:
 Blue Soul (Blue Mitchell album)
 Blue Soul (Joe Louis Walker album)